The Embassy of the United States in The Hague is the diplomatic mission of the United States in the Netherlands. It is located at John Adams Park 1 in Wassenaar, on the municipal border with The Hague.

The current American embassy building in Wassenaar opened on January 29, 2018. It replaced the former embassy building at the Lange Voorhout 102 in The Hague, which was opened on July 4, 1959; it housed the U.S. diplomatic mission to the Netherlands for nearly 60 years. This building in The Hague's city center was designed by architect Marcel Breuer and was designated a national monument in 2017.

Notable Americans such as former Presidents John Adams and John Quincy Adams, General Hugh Ewing and Iraq Envoy L. Paul Bremer have held the title of United States Ambassador to the Netherlands.

References

External links
 
 

Hague
United States
Embassay